Robert McCormick may refer to:

 Robert R. McCormick (1880–1955), American publisher of the Chicago Tribune
 Robert McCormick (explorer) (1800–1890), naturalist with the British Royal Navy
 Robert McCormick (Virginia inventor) (1780–1846), American inventor, and progenitor of the McCormick family of Chicago
 Robert McCormick, the ex-CEO of SAVVIS, Inc.
 Mack McCormick (Robert McCormick, 1930–2015), American musicologist and folklorist
 Robert Sanderson McCormick (1849–1919), American diplomat
 Robert J. McCormick (1949–2014), head of the Center for Child Advocacy and Policy program
 Robert John McCormick (1848–1919), Ontario farmer and political figure
 Bob McCormick (1864–?), Scottish footballer
 Bob McCormick (Australian footballer) (1879–1957), Australian rules footballer

See also
 Robert R. McCormick School of Engineering and Applied Science of Northwestern University
 Robert C. McCormack (born 1939), U.S. Assistant Secretary of the Navy (Financial Management), 1990–93